The HGTV Dream Home is the American cable network Home & Garden Television (HGTV)'s annual project house and sweepstakes, held since 1997. The sweepstakes commences with a January 1 television special showcasing the fully furnished, custom-built home valued in excess of one million dollars; viewers are invited to enter online. The 2012 contest drew over 81 million entries.

Starting with the 2004 Dream Home in St. Marys, Georgia, public tours have been offered, with some of the ticket proceeds going to local charitable groups. The 2012 proceeds went to the Make-A-Wish Foundation of Utah.

Most of the Dream Home winners have sold their prizes, largely because of the accompanying property tax bills, and as of 2006, only two winners had lived in their houses. 2005 winner Don Cruz initially planned to keep the house, located on Lake Tyler, after having his plan to rent out the dockhouse and master bedroom suite on a nightly basis rejected by Tyler, Texas's city government; however, he decided to sell after receiving tax forms showing the house had a higher value than he originally thought.

Dream Home locations
 1997 - Jackson, Wyoming
 1998 - Beaufort, South Carolina
 1999 - Rosemary Beach, Florida
 2000 - Nehalem, Oregon
 2001 - Camden, Maine
 2002 - Sherwood, Maryland
 2003 - Mexico Beach, Florida
 2004 - St. Marys, Georgia
 2005 - Tyler, Texas
 2006 - Lake Lure, North Carolina
 2007 - Winter Park, Colorado
 2008 - Islamorada, Florida
 2009 - Sonoma, California
 2010 - Sandia Park, New Mexico
 2011 - Stowe, Vermont
 2012 - Midway, Utah 
 2013 - Kiawah Island, South Carolina
 2014 - Truckee, California
 2015 - Martha's Vineyard, Massachusetts
 2016 - Merritt Island, Florida
 2017 - St. Simons, Georgia
 2018 - Gig Harbor, Washington
 2019 - Whitefish, Montana
 2020 - Hilton Head Island, South Carolina
 2021 - Portsmouth, Rhode Island
2022 - Warren, Vermont
2023 - Morrison, Colorado
Source:

References

External links
Home & Garden Television
Subzero.com: Kitchen Galleries of Past HGTV Dream Homes
Previous Winners of the HGTV Dream Home
Dream Home Central

See also
 Home to Win (HGTV Canada)
 Home Free (2015 TV series) (Fox TV USA)

HGTV original programming
Housing in the United States
1997 establishments in the United States